Surveyor Branch is a stream in the U.S. state of West Virginia.

Surveyor Branch was named for the fact government surveyors camped near it.

See also
List of rivers of West Virginia

References

Rivers of Summers County, West Virginia
Rivers of West Virginia